Bee is a village in Seward County, Nebraska, United States. It is part of the Lincoln, Nebraska Metropolitan Statistical Area. The population was 191 at the 2010 census.

History
Bee was laid out in 1887 when the Chicago and North Western Railroad was extended to that point. The village was named from its location in B Township.

Geography
Bee is located at  (41.005857, -97.057969).

Demographics

2010 census
At the 2010 census there were 191 people, 78 households, and 53 families in the village. The racial makeup of the village was 100.0% White. Hispanic or Latino of any race were 3.1%.

Of the 78 households 28.2% had children under the age of 18 living with them, 53.8% were married couples living together, 10.3% had a female householder with no husband present, 3.8% had a male householder with no wife present, and 32.1% were non-families. 29.5% of households were one person and 7.7% were one person aged 65 or older. The average household size was 2.45 and the average family size was 3.02.

The median age in the village was 42.8 years. 23% of residents were under the age of 18; 5.7% were between the ages of 18 and 24; 23.5% were from 25 to 44; 32.4% were from 45 to 64; and 15.2% were 65 or older. The gender makeup of the village was 52.4% male and 47.6% female.

2000 census
At the 2000 census there were 223 people, 84 households, and 60 families in the village. The population density was 899.2 people per square mile (344.4/km). There were 89 housing units at an average density of 358.9 per square mile (137.5/km).  The racial makeup of the village was 99.10% White, and 0.90% from two or more races.

Of the 84 households 33.3% had children under the age of 18 living with them, 60.7% were married couples living together, 6.0% had a female householder with no husband present, and 27.4% were non-families. 22.6% of households were one person and 13.1% were one person aged 65 or older. The average household size was 2.65 and the average family size was 3.13.

The age distribution was 28.3% under the age of 18, 5.4% from 18 to 24, 33.2% from 25 to 44, 18.8% from 45 to 64, and 14.3% 65 or older. The median age was 35 years. For every 100 females, there were 110.4 males. For every 100 females age 18 and over, there were 119.2 males.

The median household income was $42,917, and the median family income  was $44,583. Males had a median income of $26,500 versus $18,750 for females. The per capita income for the village was $18,388. About 7.3% of families and 6.6% of the population were below the poverty line, including none of those under the age of 18 and 14.7% of those 65 or over.

In popular culture
The States Ballroom was mentioned in the interactive fiction piece 17776.

References

Villages in Seward County, Nebraska
Villages in Nebraska
Lincoln, Nebraska metropolitan area